John B. Creeden  (September 12, 1871 – February 26, 1948) was an American Catholic priest and Jesuit, who served in many senior positions at Jesuit universities in the United States. Born in Massachusetts, he attended Boston College, and studied for the priesthood in Maryland and Austria. He taught at Fordham University and then at Georgetown University, where he was made Dean of Georgetown College in 1909, and simultaneously served as principal of Georgetown Preparatory School.

Creeden became president of Georgetown University in 1918. Largely shaped by the First World War, during his presidency, the School of Foreign Service was founded, for which he was awarded the Medal of Public Instruction from the President of Venezuela. In order to support the post-war enrollment boom, he also expanded the size of the campus, and established the university's first endowment, to support major campus improvements. He proposed a transformation of the campus that would involve building a new quadrangle of neo-Gothic buildings, but this vision was thwarted by the Depression of 1921. Creeden undertook a major reform of the university's organization, which included relocating Georgetown Preparatory School to a new campus, installing Jesuit regents to oversee each of the professional schools, and placing the Law School under his direct control, where he initiated a drastic improvement in the school's curriculum and admissions standards.

Following the end of his presidency in 1924, he returned to Boston College, where he briefly became Dean of the Graduate School of Arts & Sciences, before founding Boston College Law School in 1926 and serving as its first regent until 1939. At the same time, he served as regent of Georgetown Law School from 1929 to 1939. In his final years, he was a spiritual counselor at Jesuit schools in Western Massachusetts, and then became Dean of Boston College's Evening Division, which later became the Woods College of Advancing Studies.

Early life 
John B. Creeden was born on September 12, 1871, in Arlington, Massachusetts, to Irish immigrant parents. He attended Boston College, before entering the novitiate of the Society of Jesus in Frederick, Maryland, on August 14, 1890. He taught at Georgetown from 1897 to 1902, and then returned to Woodstock College to study philosophy and theology; he also spent time studying in Linz, Austria. At Woodstock, he was ordained a priest by Cardinal James Gibbons in 1905.

He then spent two years teaching at Fordham University in New York City. In 1909, he was made athletic director and prefect of studies at Georgetown, before being appointed as Dean of Georgetown College later that year. During part of his tenure as dean, he also served as principal of Georgetown Preparatory School. Upon being named president of the university, he was succeeded as dean by Edmund A. Walsh.

President of Georgetown University 

Creeden was named president of Georgetown University in May 1918, succeeding Alphonsus J. Donlon. In 1918, with the Spanish flu making its way toward Washington, Creeden resurrected the St. Joseph's Lamp Association, which was responsible for keeping a lamp burning in front of a statue of St. Joseph in a garden between Gervase Hall, Mulledy Hall, and Old South. Creeden received Ferdinand Foch, the French marshal and Commander-in-Chief of the Allied Armies, on November 20, 1921, and presented him with an honorary Doctor of Civil and Canon Laws degree, as well as a golden sword on behalf of the American Jesuits.

He voiced his opposition in 1921 to the Smith–Towner Bill, which was an unsuccessful attempt to create the U.S. Department of Education, because he believed it was both unconstitutional and unwise for the federal government to assert control over education. In the summer of 1923, Creeden developed phlebitis, which severely impacted his ability to discharge the office. By early 1924, he felt that he was no longer able to fulfill his duties, and Charles W. Lyons was named as his successor in late October 1924.

Campus improvements 
Following the end of the First World War, enrollment in all of Georgetown's schools increased greatly, especially in the Medical, Dental, and Law Schools. This put the existing facilities under significant strain. Creeden responded by buying up property bounded by 35th, 37th, P, and N Streets, adjacent to the main campus. He also sought to enhance the national reputation of the university by creating a Georgetown Publicity Bureau. This represented the first time in Georgetown's history that an endowment was sought.

The most ambitious of Creeden's visions was a vast expansion of the built campus known as the "Greater Georgetown Plan". This would involve constructing a new neo-Gothic quadrangle composed of several buildings on the site of the existing athletic field next to Healy Hall. This quadrangle would be a new home for the Medical and Dental Schools, a dormitory, a classroom building, and a science building. Creeden also planned to build a stadium nearby that could hold twenty thousand spectators. This grand plan never came to fruition because the Depression in 1921 made funding unavailable.

Separation of Georgetown Preparatory School 
At the commencement ceremony of 1919, Creeden announced that Georgetown Preparatory School would move to a separate campus at the start of the following academic year. Construction of the North Bethesda, Maryland campus was begun under his predecessor, Donlon. The purpose of this relocation was to remove the younger students from what the Jesuits viewed as the indecent temptations of the city. It was also part of the larger movement among Jesuit institutions in the United States, facing pressure from the Association of American Universities, to create separate four-year high school programs and four-year college programs, instead of combined seven-year programs. Despite the move away from Georgetown's collegiate campus, Creeden continued to take an active interest in the administration of the preparatory school, frequently visiting and meeting with the headmaster to set policies.

School of Foreign Service established 

Following the renaming of Georgetown's School of Foreign Service for Edmund A. Walsh in 1958, Henri Wiesel, a Jesuit contemporary and acquaintance of both Creeden and Walsh, wrote to the archivist of Georgetown University that, though Walsh was instrumental in the creation of the school, the true founder of the School of Foreign Service was Creeden. He said that Creeden envisioned the establishment of such a school and frequently discussed the subject, at a time when Walsh was still studying theology as part of his Jesuit formation. His motivation for the creation of the school was to bring the Society of Jesus into contact with prominent men in government and finance.

Creeden sought to establish the school at the start of his presidency, but this goal was delayed by the First World War. Another Jesuit contemporary verified that Creeden worked closely with Fr. Constantine McGuire to present the plan for the School of Foreign service to the board of regents in June 1918. Opening in 1919, the school quickly became well received in government circles in Washington, and Creeden sought to establish an endowment for it. He recruited Walsh, whose personality was more suited to public life, to recruit faculty and students and to be the face of the school, and appointed him as the first regent of the school. In recognition of Creeden's role in the founding of the School of Foreign Service, the President of Venezuela, Victorino Márquez Bustillos, awarded him the Medal of Public Instruction in 1920, the highest educational honor bestowed by Venezuela on a foreign citizen. He was presented with the award during the Venezuelan Minister of Public Education's visit to Washington.

Law School reform 

The Association of American Law Schools (AALS) gave Georgetown Law School a quality rating of B, prompting Creeden to undertake a major reorganization of the governance of the school. In the spring of 1920, he obtained the consent of the board of regents to effectively terminate the semi-autonomous status of the law school, bringing it under closer control of the university leadership. This involved appointing a Jesuit regent to ensure the school was conforming to the tradition and mission of the university (a reform Creeden and a later president, Coleman Nevils, implemented at all of the university's professional schools), and creating an executive faculty that consisted of the president, the dean of the law school, and six professors chosen by the president.

In order to improve the quality of the school, he also had new bylaws adopted, which significantly raised the standards for admission to the law school. Applicants were required to have at least completed four years of high school. By 1925, this standard was raised to require at least two years of college, with courses in history, economics, political science, ethics, logic, and rhetoric. With the support of Dean George E. Hamilton, in October 1921, day classes were offered for the first time (while until then, there were evening classes designed for part-time students), and several full-time professors were hired to supplement the part-time faculty that maintained active law practices. Evening students were required to study for four years, instead of the previous three. These reforms resulted in the AALS upgrading Georgetown's rating to an A in 1925. Creeden and other administrators anticipated a decrease in enrollment due to these heightened standards, but this decrease was smaller than expected, and returned to previous levels within several years.

Later years 

Creeden then went to Boston College, where he taught philosophy from 1924 to 1926. In 1926, he was appointed Dean of the Graduate School of Arts & Sciences. He then founded the Boston College Law School, and served as its first regent from 1926 to 1939. At the same time, he became the regent of Georgetown Law School in 1929, and held this position for ten years. Following his law school deanships, he served as spiritual counselor from 1939 to 1942 at Cranwell Preparatory School in Lenox, Massachusetts, and from 1942 to 1947 at Shadowbrook, the Jesuit novitiate in Stockbridge, Massachusetts. He also became the first Dean of the Boston College Evening Division, which later became the Woods College of Advancing Studies. On February 26, 1948, Creeden died in Boston.

Notes

References

Citations

Sources 

1871 births
1948 deaths
People from Arlington, Massachusetts
19th-century American Jesuits
20th-century American Jesuits
Boston College alumni
Woodstock College alumni
Fordham University faculty
Georgetown University faculty
Deans of Georgetown College
Presidents of Georgetown University
Boston College faculty
Georgetown University Law Center faculty